Hřivice is a municipality and village in Louny District in the Ústí nad Labem Region of the Czech Republic. It has about 600 inhabitants.

Administrative parts
Villages of Markvarec and Touchovice are administrative parts of Hřivice.

References

Villages in Louny District